A dharmapāla is a type of wrathful god in Buddhism. The name means "dharma protector" in Sanskrit, and the dharmapālas are also known as the Defenders of the Justice (Dharma), or the Guardians of the Law. There are two kinds of dharmapala, Worldly Guardians (lokapala) and Wisdom Protectors (jnanapala). Only Wisdom Protectors are enlightened beings.

Description 
A protector of Buddhist dharma is called a dharmapala. They are typically wrathful deities, depicted with terrifying iconography in the Mahayana and tantric traditions of Buddhism. The wrathfulness is intended to depict their willingness to defend and guard Buddhist followers from dangers and enemies. The Aṣṭagatyaḥ (the eight kinds of nonhuman beings) is one category of dharmapālas, which includes the Garuda, Deva, Naga, Yaksha, Gandharva, Asura, Kinnara and Mahoraga.

In Vajrayana iconography and thangka depictions, dharmapala are fearsome beings, often with many heads, many hands, or many feet. Dharmapala often have blue, black or red skin, and a fierce expression with protruding fangs. Although dharmapala have a terrifying appearance, they only act in a wrathful way for the benefit of sentient beings.

The devotional worship of dharmapālas in the Tibetan tradition is traceable to early 8th-century.

Tibetan Buddhism

There are many different dharmapalas in Tibetan Buddhism. Each school has its own principle dharmapalas and most monasteries have a dedicated dharmapāla which was originally comparable to a genius loci. The many forms of Mahakala are emanations of Avalokiteshvara. Kalarupa and Yamantaka are considered by practitioners to be emanations of Manjushri the Bodhisattva of Wisdom.

Principal wisdom protector dharmapalas include:
 Prana Atma (Tib. Begtse)
 Ekajaṭī (Tib. ral chig ma)
 Mahakala (Tib. Nagpo Chenpo)
 Shri Devi (Tib. Palden Lhamo)
 Yama (Tib. Shinje)

Other dharmapalas include:
 Citipati
 Mahakali
 Yamantaka (Tib. Shinje Shed)
 Hayagriva (Tib. Tamdrin)
 Vaisravana (Tib. Kubera)
 Rāhula (Tib. gza)
 Vajrasādhu (Tib. Dorje Legpa)
 Brahma (Tib. "Tshangs Pa") 
 Maharakta (Tib. tsog gi dag po, mar chen)
 Kurukulla (Tib.  rig che ma)
 Vajrayaksa  (Takkiraja) (Tib. du pai gyal po)

The main functions of a dharmapāla are said to be to avert the inner and outer obstacles that prevent spiritual practitioners from attaining spiritual realizations, as well as to foster the necessary conditions for their practice.

Chinese Buddhism 
In Chinese Buddhism, the Twenty-Four Protective Deities or the Twenty-Four Devas (Chinese: 二十四諸天; pinyin: Èrshísì Zhūtiān) are a group of gods who are venerated as dharmapālas. In addition, Wisdom Kings such as Acala, Ucchusma, Mahamayuri and Hayagriva are venerated as dharmapālas as well.

Shingon Buddhism
In Japanese Shingon Buddhism, a descendant of Tangmi, or Chinese Esoteric Buddhism, dharmapālas such as Acala and Yamantaka are classified as Wisdom Kings. Other dharmapālas, notably Mahakala, belong to the Deva realm, the fourth and lowest class in the hierarchy of honorable beings.

Related deities 
In Tibetan Buddhism, there are two other classes of defender, the lokapālas and Kshetrapala Papiya, Guan Yu and Hachiman are also known as defenders.

See also 
 Begtse
 Chinese guardian lions
 Gyalpo spirits
 Palden Lhamo
 Skanda (Buddhism)
 Snow Lion
 Nio

References

Bibliography
 Kalsang, Ladrang (1996). The Guardian Deities of Tibet Delhi: Winsome Books. (Third Reprint 2003) .
 Linrothe, Rob (1999). Ruthless Compassion: Wrathful Deities in Early Indo-Tibetan Esoteric Buddhist Art London: Serindia Publications. .
 De Nebesky-Wojkowitz, Rene (1956). Oracles and Demons of Tibet. Oxford University Press. Reprint Delhi: Books Faith, 1996 - . Reprint Delhi: Paljor Publications, 2002 - .

External links

Buddhist Protectors - outline page at Himalayan Art Resources
Citipati Buddhist Protector - Citipati Ritual Mask